Philippe Petit (born 13 August 1949) is a French high-wire artist who gained fame for his unauthorized high-wire walks between the towers of Notre Dame Cathedral in Paris in 1971 and of Sydney Harbour Bridge in 1973, as well as between the Twin Towers of the World Trade Center in New York City on the morning of 7 August 1974. He performed for 45 minutes, making eight passes along the wire.

Since then, Petit has lived in New York, where he has been artist-in-residence at the Cathedral of St. John the Divine, also a location of other aerial performances. He has done wire walking as part of official celebrations in New York, across the United States, and in France and other countries, as well as teaching workshops on the art. In 2008, Man on Wire, a documentary directed by James Marsh about Petit's walk between the towers, won numerous awards. He was also the subject of a children's book and an animated adaptation of it, released in 2005. The Walk, a film based on Petit's walk, was released in September 2015, starring Joseph Gordon-Levitt as Petit and directed by Robert Zemeckis.

He also became adept at equestrianism, juggling, fencing, carpentry, rock-climbing, and bullfighting. Spurning circuses and their formulaic performances, he created his street persona on the sidewalks of Paris. In the early 1970s, he visited New York City, where he frequently juggled and worked on a slackline in Washington Square Park.

Early life
Petit was born in Nemours, Seine-et-Marne, France; his father Edmond Petit was an author and an Army Pilot. At an early age, Petit discovered magic and juggling. He loved to climb, and at 16, he took his first steps on a tightrope wire. He told a reporter,
Within one year, I taught myself to do all the things you could do on a wire. I learned the backward somersault, the front somersault, the unicycle, the bicycle, the chair on the wire, jumping through hoops. But I thought, "What is the big deal here? It looks almost ugly." So I started to discard those tricks and to reinvent my art.

In June 1971, Petit secretly installed a cable between the two towers of Notre Dame de Paris. On the morning of 26 June 1971, he "juggled balls" and "pranced back and forth" as he crossed the wire on foot to the applause of the crowd below.

World Trade Center walk
Petit became known to New Yorkers in the early 1970s for his frequent tightrope-walking performances and magic shows in the city parks, especially Washington Square Park. The towers were still under construction and had not yet been fully occupied. He performed for 45 minutes, making eight passes along the wire, during which he walked, danced, lay down on the wire, and saluted watchers from a kneeling position. Office workers, construction crews and policemen cheered him on.

Planning
Petit conceived his "coup" when he was 18, when he first read about the proposed construction of the Twin Towers and saw drawings of the project in a magazine he read in 1968 while sitting at a dentist's office. Petit was seized by the idea of performing there, and began collecting articles on the Towers whenever he could.

What was called the "artistic crime of the century" took Petit six years' planning. During this period, he learned everything he could about the buildings and their construction. In the same period, he began to perform high-wire walking at other famous places. Rigging his wire secretly, he performed as a combination of circus act and public display. In 1971, he performed his first such walk between the towers of the cathedral of Notre Dame de Paris, while priests were being ordained inside the building. In 1973, he walked a wire rigged between the two north pylons of the Sydney Harbour Bridge.

In planning for the Twin Towers walk, Petit had to learn how to accommodate issues such as the swaying of the high towers due to wind, which was part of their design; effects of wind and weather on the wire at that height, how to rig a  steel cable across the  gap between the towers (at a height of ), and how to gain entry with his collaborators, first to scope out the conditions and lastly to stage the project. They had to bring heavy equipment to the rooftops. He traveled to New York on numerous occasions to make first-hand observations.

Since the towers were still under construction, Petit and one of his collaborators, New York-based photographer Jim Moore, rented a helicopter to take aerial photographs of the buildings. Two more collaborators, Jean-François and Jean-Louis, helped him practice in a field in France, and accompanied him to take part in the final rigging of the project, as well as to photograph it. Francis Brunn, a German juggler, provided financial support for the proposed project and its planning.

Petit and his crew gained entry into the towers several times and hid in upper floors and on the roofs of the unfinished buildings to study security measures. They also analyzed the construction and identified places to anchor the wire and cavalletti. Using his own observations, drawings, and Moore's photographs, Petit constructed a scale model of the towers to design the needed rigging for the wire walk.

Working from the ID of an American who worked in the building, Petit made fake identification cards for himself and his collaborators (claiming they were contractors who were installing an electrified fence on the roof) to gain access to the buildings. Prior to this, Petit had carefully observed the clothes worn by construction workers and the kinds of tools they carried. He also took note of the clothing of office workers so that some of his collaborators could pose as white-collar workers. He observed what time the workers arrived and left, so he could determine when he would have roof access.

As the target date of his "coup" approached, he claimed to be a journalist with Metropolis, a French architecture magazine, so that he could gain permission to interview the workers on the roof. The Port Authority allowed Petit to conduct the interviews, which he used as a pretext to make more observations.

On the night of Tuesday, 6 August 1974, Petit and his crew had a lucky break and got a ride in a freight elevator to the 104th floor with their equipment. They stored it 19 steps below the roof. To pass the cable across the void, Petit and his crew had settled on using a bow and arrow attached to a rope. They had to practice this many times to perfect their technique. They first shot across a fishing line, which was attached to larger ropes, and finally to the  steel cable. The team was delayed when the heavy cable sank too fast, and had to be pulled up manually for hours. Petit had already identified points at which to anchor two tiranti (guy lines) to other points to stabilize the cable and keep the swaying of the wire to a minimum.

Event
Shortly after 7 am local time, Petit stepped out on the wire and started to perform. He performed for 45 minutes, making eight passes along the wire, during which he walked, danced, lay down on the wire, and knelt to salute watchers. Crowds gathered on the streets below. He said later that he could hear their murmuring and cheers.

When New York Police Department and Port Authority of New York police officers learned of his stunt, they came up to the roofs of both buildings to try to persuade him to leave the wire. They threatened to pluck him off by helicopter. Feeling that he had "trespassed long enough into these forbidden regions," Petit left the wire and surrendered to the police.

Aftermath
There was extensive news coverage and public appreciation of Petit's high-wire walk. The district attorney dropped all formal charges of trespassing and other items relating to his walk on condition that Petit give a free aerial show for children in Central Park. He performed on a high-wire walk in the park above Belvedere Lake (now known as Turtle Pond).

The Port Authority of New York and New Jersey gave Petit a lifetime pass to the Twin Towers' Observation Deck. He autographed a steel beam close to the point where he began his walk.

Petit's high-wire walk is credited with bringing the Twin Towers much-needed attention and even affection, as they initially had been unpopular. Critics such as historian Lewis Mumford had regarded them as ugly and utilitarian in design, and too large a development for the area. The Port Authority was having trouble renting out all of the office space.

Representation in other media
Petit's World Trade Center stunt was the subject of Sandi Sissel's 1984 half-hour documentary, High Wire, which featured music from Philip Glass's Glassworks.

Mordicai Gerstein wrote and illustrated a children's book, The Man Who Walked Between The Towers (2003), which won a Caldecott Medal for his art. It was adapted and produced as an animated short film by the same title, directed by Michael Sporn and released in 2005, which won several awards.

The documentary film Man on Wire (2008), by UK director James Marsh, is about Petit and his 1974 WTC performance. It won both the World Cinema Jury and Audience awards at the Sundance Film Festival 2008. It combines historical footage with re-enactment and has the spirit of a heist film. It won awards at the 2008 Full Frame Documentary Film Festival in Durham, North Carolina, and the Academy Award for Best Documentary in 2009. On stage with Marsh to accept the Oscar award, Petit made a coin vanish in his hands while thanking the Academy "for believing in magic". He balanced the Oscar by its head on his chin to cheers from the audience.

The same stunt was fictionalized in a biographical drama entitled The Walk (2015), directed by Robert Zemeckis and starring Joseph Gordon-Levitt as Petit.

Author Colum McCann fictionalized Petit's appearance above New York as a unifying thread throughout his 2009 novel Let the Great World Spin.

Later life
Petit has made dozens of public high-wire performances in his career. For example, in 1986 he re-enacted the crossing of the Niagara River by Blondin for an IMAX film. In 1989, to celebrate the 200th anniversary of the French Revolution, mayor Jacques Chirac invited him to walk an inclined wire strung from the ground at the Place du Trocadéro to the second level of the Eiffel Tower, crossing the Seine.

Petit briefly headlined with the Ringling Brothers Circus, but preferred staging his own performances. He says he has never fallen during a performance. "If I had, I wouldn't be here talking about it."

Petit regularly gives lectures and workshops internationally on a variety of topics and subjects. He single-handedly built a barn in the Catskill Mountains using the methods and tools of 18th-century timber framers. In 2011, he published his eighth book, A Square Peg. He has also created an ebook for TED Books, entitled Cheating the Impossible: Ideas and Recipes from a Rebellious High-Wire Artist. Petit divides his time between New York City, where he is an artist in residence at the Cathedral of Saint John the Divine, and a hideaway in the Catskill Mountains.

Among those who have associated with some of his projects are such artists as Mikhail Baryshnikov, Werner Herzog, Annie Leibovitz, Miloš Forman, Volker Schlöndorff, Twyla Tharp, Peter Beard, Marcel Marceau, Paul Auster, Paul Winter, Debra Winger, Robin Williams and Sting.

Director James Signorelli assisted with creation of Petit's book To Reach the Clouds (2002), about the Twin Towers walk. Petit not only wrote about his feat, and events that led to the performance, but also expressed his emotions following the September 11 attacks, during which the Twin Towers were destroyed. He wrote that on that morning, "My towers became our towers. I saw them collapse – hurling, crushing thousands of lives. Disbelief preceded sorrow for the obliteration of the buildings, perplexity descended before rage at the unbearable loss of life." Petit paid tribute to those who were killed and supported rebuilding the towers, promising that "When the towers again twin-tickle the clouds, I offer to walk again, to be the expression of the builders' collective voice. Together, we will rejoice in an aerial song of victory." However, a different complex of buildings has been developed on the site, and does not offer this opportunity.

Legacy and honors
James Parks Morton Interfaith Award
 Streb Action Maverick Award 
 The Byrdcliffe Award

Works and performances

Major high-wire performances

Bibliography
 Philippe Petit, Two towers, I walk, (New York: Reader's Digest, 1975), ASIN B00072LQRM
 Philippe Petit, Trois Coups, (Paris: Herscher, 1983). 
 Philippe Petit, On The High Wire, Preface by Marcel Marceau, Postface by Werner Herzog (New York: Random House, 1985). 
 Philippe Petit, Funambule, (Paris: Albin Michel, 1991) 
 Philippe Petit, Traité du funambulisme, Preface by Paul Auster, (Arles: Actus Sud, 1997), (in French / en français)
 Philippe Petit, Über Mir Der Offene Himmel, (Stuttgart: Urachhaus, 1998) 
 Philippe Petit, Trattato di Funambolismo, (Milano: Ponte Alle Grazie, 1999) 
 Philippe Petit, To Reach The Clouds: My High Wire Walk Between The Twin Towers, (New York, North Point Press, 2002). ASIN B000UDX0JA, 
 Philippe Petit, L'Art du Pickpocket, (Arles: Actes Sud, 2006) 
 Philippe Petit, Alcanzar las nubes, (Alpha Decay, Barcelona, 2007) 
 Philippe Petit, Man on Wire, (Skyhorse Publishing, New York, 2008) 
 Philippe Petit, Why knot?: how to tie more than sixty ingenious, useful, beautiful, lifesaving, and secure knots!, (Abrams Image, New York, 2013) 
 Philippe Petit, Creativity: The Perfect Crime, (Riverhead Hardcover, 2014) 
 Philippe Petit, On The High Wire Re-release, Preface by Marcel Marceau, Postface by Werner Herzog (New York: New Directions, 2019).

Filmography

In culture
 The song, "Man on Wire" by the band 27 is a tribute to Philippe Petit.
 The song, "Sleepwalking," by Danish composer Ste van Holm is a tribute to Petit's World Trade Center walk.
 The Low Anthem's song, "Boeing 737", from their 2011 album Smart Flesh, refers to Petit's Twin Towers walk.
 American rock band Incubus used a photo of Petit as the cover art for their album, If Not Now, When? (2011).
 Colum McCann's National Book Award-winning novel, Let the Great World Spin (2009), features Petit's Twin Towers walk as its opening passage and a centrepiece to which numerous characters are connected.
 "Funambulist", a song by American metal band Cormorant, is about his walk between the Twin Towers.
 The song "Step Out Of The Void" by musician Howard Moss is a tribute to Philippe Petit, in the album Outside the Pale (2013).
 The song "Man On A Wire" by The Script on their fourth album, No Sound Without Silence, is influenced by Petit's high-wire legacy.
 The song "Stand Up Comedy" by U2 on their twelfth album, No Line on the Horizon, references "The wire is stretched in between our two towers".
 Petit was the inspiration for the 5th Anniversary 9/11 cover of The New Yorker magazine (11 September 2006), "Soaring Spirit", by John Mavroudis (concept) and Owen Smith (art). That cover was named Cover of the Year by the American Society of Magazine Editors (ASME). The two-part cover was a first for The New Yorker.

See also
Harry Gardiner
Dan Goodwin
Ivan Kristoff
Owen Quinn
Alain Robert
The Flying Wallendas
George Willig

References

Further reading
 Mordicai Gerstein, The Man Who Walked Between the Towers (Roaring Brook Press, 2003) 
 David Chelsea, 9-11: Artists Respond feature entitled "He Walks on Air 110 Stories High" (DC Comics, 2002) 
 Ralph Keyes, Chancing It: Why We Take Risks (Little, Brown & Company, 1985) 
 Angus K. Gillespie, Twin Towers: the Life of New York City's World Trade Center (Rutgers University Press, 1999) 
 James Glanz and Eric Lipton, City in the Sky (New York: Times Book, 2003) 
 Colum McCann, Let the Great World Spin (New York: Random House, 2009)

Articles and interviews
 Rosenthal, Adam (1 September 2012). "Suspended Reading: Man on Wire, 9/11 and the Logic of the High-Wire." Screening the Past.

External links
 Columbia Artists Management Inc. — Philippe Petit

 MSA – The Man Who Walked Between The Towers. Co-produced by Michael Sporn Animation and Weston Woods Studios
 Philippe Petit Signature visible in the 1980s
 photos of Philippe Petit crossing the Twin Towers along with others
 Philippe Petit: The journey across the high wire, TED2012, Filmed Mar 2012, Posted May 2012.

1949 births
Living people
People from Nemours
French emigrants to the United States
French magicians
French stunt performers
Tightrope walkers
Jugglers
Unicyclists